Warin Archdeacon was an English politician who was MP for Cornwall in 1380 and 1382. He was the son of John Archdeacon, in turn a son of Thomas Archdeacon, and an elder brother of Michael Archdeacon.

References

English MPs January 1380
English MPs May 1382
Members of the Parliament of England (pre-1707) for Cornwall
English MPs November 1380
English MPs October 1382